Canadian National Railways U-1-f class locomotives were a class of twenty 4-8-2 or Mountain type locomotives built by Montreal Locomotive Works in 1944. They were numbered 6060–6079 by CN and nicknamed "Bullet Nose Bettys" due to their distinctive cone-shape smokebox door cover.

Construction history
The order for these engines came during World War II when steel was of extreme value. The mountain type locomotive was a step down in size from the much more prevalent Northern Type (4-8-4). As a result of the step down in size the mountain type had less power but more speed and served well as a general purpose workhorse.

Modifications
Half the class had been converted to oil-firing by October 1944. This resulted in the 18-ton coal/ tender being exchanged for a  oil/ water tender. In later years several locomotives lost the distinctive cone-shaped smokebox door cover.

Preservation
Of the twenty locomotives that were built, only three remain in existence: 6060 owned by the Rocky Mountain Rail Society at the Alberta Prairie Railway, Stettler, Alberta; 6069 at Sarnia, Ontario; and 6077 at the Northern Ontario Railroad Museum, at Capreol, Ontario.

6060's restoration and run to Expo 86
In 1985 through to early 1986, Harry Home led efforts to restore CN 6060 and run it to Expo 86 in Vancouver. The 6060 was rebuilt in Jasper, Alberta, and was run under its own power to Vancouver for the "Cavalcade of Steam", an event which celebrated operational steam locomotives from around the world. 6060 arrived in Vancouver on the second-to-last day of the steam exhibit, and was welcomed by an extremely large crowd of people, happy to see the success of the restoration.

References

4-8-2 locomotives
Steam locomotives of Canada
U-1-f
MLW locomotives
Railway locomotives introduced in 1944
Standard gauge locomotives of Canada
Passenger locomotives